Bromberg was the northern of two Prussian government regions, or Regierungsbezirke, of the Grand Duchy of Posen (1815–1848) and its successor, the Province of Posen (1848–1919). The administrative center was the city of Bromberg (Bydgoszcz), which is now part of Poland.

The region was bordered on the south by the Regierungsbezirk Posen, to the west by the Province of Brandenburg, to the north by West Prussia, and to the east by Congress Poland (part of the Russian Empire).

The Bromberg region had a larger percentage of mostly Protestant Germans than average for the Province of Posen. Other German speakers were by religion Jewish or Roman Catholic. However, around half the population were Roman Catholic Poles. Initially, there was a sizable Jewish minority, but that number diminished over time due to the Ostflucht.

Divisions
Note: Prussian provinces were subdivided into units called Kreise (singular Kreis, abbreviated Kr., English "circle"), which were similar to small counties in US terms, "rural districts" in British terms. The larger cities would have their own Stadtkreis (English: "urban district") and the surrounding rural area would be named for the city, but referred to as a Landkreis (English: "rural district"). In the case of Posen, the Landkreis was split into two: Landkreis Posen West, and Landkreis Posen East. The region was originally divided into several larger Kreise, which were later divided into the final 13 Kreise, the larger ones spinning off smaller units.

Demographics

See also
 Netze District
 Bydgoszcz District
 Bydgoszcz Department

References

States and territories disestablished in 1919
History of Bydgoszcz
Grand Duchy of Posen
Government regions of Prussia
States and territories established in 1815
1815 establishments in Prussia
Former administrative regions of Greater Poland
Province of Posen
1919 disestablishments in Germany